The siege of Tarnovo occurred in the spring of 1393 and resulted in a decisive Ottoman victory. With the fall of its capital, the Bulgarian Empire was reduced to a few fortresses along the Danube.

Origins of the conflict 
Tarnovo exceeded all Bulgarian towns by its size, its treasures, and its partly natural, partly artificial fortifications. Therefore, the Turks attacked this area of Bulgaria first.

The battle 
In the spring of 1393, Bayazid I gathered his troops from Asia Minor, crossed the Dardanelles, and joined with his western army, which likely included some Christian rulers from Macedonia. He entrusted the main command to his son Celebi, and ordered him to depart for Tarnovo. Suddenly, the town was besieged from all sides. The Turks threatened the citizens with fire and death if they did not surrender.

The population resisted but eventually surrendered after a three-month siege, following an attack from the direction of Tsarevets, on July 17, 1393. The Patriarch's church "Ascension of Christ" was turned into a mosque, the rest of the churches were also turned into mosques, baths, or stables. All palaces and churches of Trapezitsa were burned down and destroyed. The same fate was expected for the tzar palaces of Tsarevets; however, parts of their walls and towers were left standing until the 17th century.

In the absence of Tsar Ivan Shishman, who attempted to fight the Turks elsewhere, leading the remnants of his troops to the fortress of Nikopol, the main Bulgarian leader in the town was Patriarch Evtimiy. He went to the Turkish camp with the intention of assuaging the Turkish commander, who listened politely to his pleas, but afterwards fulfilled very little of his promises. After a fierce battle, the town was captured by the Turks under Celebi.

Celebi left the town after appointing a local commander. The new governor gathered all eminent citizens and boyars under a pretense and had them all killed. According to legend, Evtimiy was sentenced to death but saved at the last minute by a miracle. After leaving behind a Turkish commander to govern the town, Celebi left and joined up his army with the main army led by his father Bayazid I and they went on to capture the fortress of Nikopol. This rapid success by the Turks led a great deal of panic throughout the rest of Europe and the Pope called for a Crusade. This Crusade would be fought at Nikopol three years later in the Battle of Nicopolis.

Aftermath 
Later, the city's leading citizens were sent into exile in Asia Minor, where their historical traces are lost. The patriarch was sent into exile in Thrace. He died in exile and was later hailed as a national saint of his people.

The citizens of Tarnovo that remained in the town saw what was described by contemporary sources as a  "complete devastation of the town". Turkish colonists occupied Tsarevets which from then on was called Hisar. The disciples of Evtimiy dispersed to Russia and Serbia, taking with them Bulgarian books, in the same way as the Greek learned men enriched the West with the old classics. Many merchants and boyars converted to Islam. The famous church of the Holy Forty Martyrs, built by Ivan Asen II, somewhat damaged after the battle, was turned into a mosque.

The fall of Tarnovo and the exile of Patriarch Evtimiy mark the destruction of the Bulgarian Orthodox Church. As early as August 1394, the Patriarch of Constantinople appointed the Moldovan metropolitan bishop to carry the episcopal symbols in Tarnovo, where he came the following year. In 1402, Tarnovo had its own metropolitan, subjected to the Byzantine patriarch. Thus, the Bulgarian state fell under Turkish rule while the Bulgarian church fell under Greek rule.

References 
This article incorporates text from K. J. Jireček, Geschichte der Bulgaren (1876), a publication now in the public domain.

 
 Tsamblak, Grigory. Hagiography of Patriarch Evtimiy Tarnovski. Glasnik 31(1371), pp. 248–292

Sieges involving the Second Bulgarian Empire
Sieges involving the Ottoman Empire
1393 in Europe
Conflicts in 1393
14th century in Bulgaria
1393 in the Ottoman Empire